Ilaria Salvatori (born 5 February 1979 in Frascati) is an Italian foil fencer.

Biography
She won a bronze medal in the foil team event at the 2008 Summer Olympics. and gold medal in the same event in 2012 Summer Olympics.

References

External links
 

1979 births
Living people
People from Frascati
Italian female fencers
Fencers at the 2008 Summer Olympics
Fencers at the 2012 Summer Olympics
Olympic fencers of Italy
Olympic gold medalists for Italy
Olympic bronze medalists for Italy
Olympic medalists in fencing
Medalists at the 2012 Summer Olympics
Medalists at the 2008 Summer Olympics
Fencers of Centro Sportivo Aeronautica Militare
Sportspeople from the Metropolitan City of Rome Capital
20th-century Italian women
21st-century Italian women